John B. Atamian (born September 7, 1942) was a Canadian football player who played for the Hamilton Tiger-Cats, Toronto Argonauts, Saskatchewan Roughriders, Winnipeg Blue Bombers and Calgary Stampeders. He won the Grey Cup with the Tiger-Cats in 1965 and with the Stampeders in 1971. He played college football at the University of Notre Dame in Notre Dame, Indiana.

References

1942 births
Sportspeople from Niagara Falls, New York
Players of American football from New York (state)
Hamilton Tiger-Cats players
Living people
University of Notre Dame alumni
Toronto Argonauts players
Saskatchewan Roughriders players
Winnipeg Blue Bombers players
Calgary Stampeders players